Ice hockey at the 2007 Winter Universiade includes only a men's event.

Group stage
While the 2007 Winter Universiade took place in Torino, Italy, the ice hockey matches were played in Torre Pellice municipality and in Tazolli Torino.

Group A
Standings

18 January 2007

19 January 2007

21 January 2007

22 January 2007

24 January 2007

Group B
Standings

18 January 2007

19 January 2007

21 January 2007

22 January 2007

24 January 2007

Placement Games

5th Place Game

25 January 2007

7th Place Game

25 January 2007

9th Place Game

25 January 2007

Medal Round

Semifinals

26 January 2007

Final Game

27 January 2007

Bronze Game

27 January 2007

References

External links
Results book

2007 Winter Universiade
Universiade, 2007
2007
2007